The Surami Pass is a mountain pass in the Likhi Range of Georgia with an altitude of .

The pass connects the western and eastern part of Georgia.  A railroad (in a tunnel) runs through the pass, as well as the ZestaponiKhashuri highway.

History 

Rail service through Surami Pass was opened in 1872. The rail line was electrified in 1933.

References 

Mountain passes of Georgia (country)